Fabrizio Costantini is Sammarinese football manager who currently manages the San Marino national team.

Playing career
During his playing career Costantini played for Sammarinese clubs Juvenes/Dogana, Tre Penne, Cosmos, and San Giovanni in addition to Italian clubs.

Managaerial career
In San Marino Costantini managed Fiorentino, Juvenes/Dogana, and Murata. He led Juvenes/Dogana to the final of the 2014–15 Campionato Sammarinese di Calcio. In November 2021 following the departure of Franco Varrella, Costantini was named manager of the San Marino national team. He was coming off of a four-year stint as manager of San Marino's national under-21 side.

Managerial statistics

References

External links
San Marino Football Federation profile
Soccerway profile

Sammarinese footballers
San Marino national football team managers
1968 births
Living people